Not Penis Cream is the first EP release by the band I Voted for Kodos. It was released after their first album Close Enough For Ska, and features the same style of ska punk.

The name "Not Penis Cream" (and also a song on the EP) was inspired by a Saturday Night Live skit from 1994. The skit featured Steve Martin selling his own brand of beauty product called "Penis Beauty Cream." The cover of the EP has a brown paper package with the words "Not Penis Cream" labeled across the front in block red letters, just as described by Steve Martin in the SNL skit.

Track listing
 "On The Phone"
 "Pastaroni"
 "Where Are We Going To"
 "Not Penis Cream"
 "All I Have Left"
 "I Tied My Own Shoes Today"

Credits
 Rick Bisenius - lead vocals, trombone, moog
 Chris Holoyda - guitar
 Lee Gordon – mellophone, backing vocals, guitar
 Nick Rydell - alto sax
 Andrew Anderson - piano, organ, trumpet
 Ross Gilliland - bass, backing vocals
 Paul Reinke - drums
 Andrew "Dafe" Fenton - guitar
 Tom Kaboski - tenor sax on tracks 1 & 2
 Dave Bartov - trumpet on tracks 1 & 2, lyrics on track 2

I Voted for Kodos albums
2003 EPs